Warta Nabada District is a district in the southeastern Banaadir region of Somalia. It is one of the larger neighborhoods of the capital Mogadishu. The presidential compound Villa Somalia, the Federal Parliament building and Mogadishu Stadium are all located in this district. Warta Nabada District was previously known as the Wardhigley District until a name change in April 2012. Yasin Nur Isse serves as the district commissioner, having succeeded Hussein Ibrahim Ali on 24 April 2014.

Notes

References
Districts of Somalia
Administrative map of Warta Nabadda District

Districts of Somalia
Banaadir